Crwys Road is a proposed railway station on the Rhymney line in Cardiff, Wales, serving the Cathays and Roath districts of the city. It is planned as part of the South Wales Metro. It is included in Transport for Wales' list of station openings which would see the station completed by December 2023.

See also 

 South Wales Metro
 Transport for Wales
 Proposed railway stations in Wales
 Transport in Cardiff

References

Proposed railway stations in Wales
Railway stations scheduled to open in 2023